The 25th Hour is the sixth studio album by American beatdown hardcore band Terror.

Recorded in January 2015 by Paul Miner at Buzzbomb Soundlabs, mixed by Tom Soares at Reel 4 Reel, and mastered by Drew Lavyne, the album was released on August 7, 2015.

Track listing

Personnel 
Terror
 Scott Vogel – vocals
 Jordan Posner – guitar
 Martin Stewart – guitar
 David Wood – bass
 Nick Jett – drums

Additional gang vocals
 Cesar Trejo
 Colin Young
 Taylor Young
 Albo Felix
 Dan Weinraub
 Andrew Kline
 Nate Blauvelt
 Ben Cook

Charts

References 

2015 albums
Terror (band) albums
Victory Records albums